Same-sex marriage in Luxembourg has been legal since 1 January 2015. A bill for the legalisation of same-sex marriages was enacted by the Chamber of Deputies on 18 June 2014 and signed into law by Grand Duke Henri on 4 July. Partnerships have also been available in Luxembourg since November 2004.

Partnerships

On 7 December 1995, Deputy Lydie Err introduced a private member's bill to create free unions, granting same-sex couples some of the rights and benefits of marriage. Her party, the Luxembourg Socialist Workers' Party (LSAP), was part of the Juncker–Poos Government together with the Christian Social People's Party (CSV). A bill to legalise same-sex marriage was introduced as early as 9 May 1996 by Deputy Renée Wagener of the opposition Greens. Both proposals would not get a Council of State opinion until 13 June 2000.

The Juncker–Polfer Government consisting of the CSV and the Democratic Party drafted a bill establishing partnerships, approving it in cabinet on 26 April 2002. On 13 January 2004, the Council of State criticised taking the French civil solidarity pact as basis rather than the Belgian statutory cohabitation, which was of superior legal quality. The Council also recommended considering the legalisation of same-sex marriage, again taking neighbouring Belgium, which had then recently taken that step, as example.

The government bill, along with the two earlier proposals, were debated and voted on together on 12 May 2004. The Chamber of Deputies approved the partnership bill, with 33 votes in favour (by the two governing parties), 7 votes against (by the Alternative Democratic Reform Party (ADR)) and 20 abstentions (by the LSAP, the Greens, and The Left), while rejecting the bill creating free unions and the same-sex marriage bill, with the two governing parties voting against and the opposition parties voting in favour (except for ADR voting against the same-sex marriage bill). The partnership law was signed by Grand Duke Henri on 9 July 2004 and took effect on 1 November 2004. The partnerships, which are based on the French civil solidarity pact, are available to same-sex and opposite-sex couples. These partnerships provide many of the rights of marriage including welfare benefits and fiscal advantages, but exclude adoption rights.

Statistics
In 2011, 88.1% of Luxembourg couples were married, 2.7% were in a partnership and 9.1% were cohabiting.

Same-sex marriage

The ruling Christian Social People's Party until 2009 was opposed to same-sex marriage, even though Prime Minister Jean-Claude Juncker, originating from the same party, had expressed his personal support. In July 2007, a motion calling for the legalisation of same-sex marriage was rejected by Parliament, on a 38–22 vote.

In July 2009, the newly formed Juncker–Asselborn Government announced its intention to legalise same-sex marriage. During a debate on 19 January 2010, the Minister of Justice, François Biltgen, announced that a law to legalise same-sex marriage (with the exception of certain adoption rights) would be finalized before the summer vacation break of Parliament. On 9 July 2010, the government approved the bill, and on 10 August 2010 it was submitted to Parliament. In May 2012, the bill was re-drafted and a vote was not expected at least until 2013. On 27 November 2012, the Council of State delivered a negative response to the bill, but asked Parliament to open a debate on the topic if it moved to vote on the bill. Some members of the Council submitted separate opinions supporting the bill.

On 6 February 2013, the Parliament's Legal Affairs Committee agreed to approve the measure opening marriage to same-sex couples. On 20 February, the committee backed the right to simple adoption for same-sex couples, but restricting plenary adoption to opposite-sex couples. On 6 March 2013, the committee confirmed that position. However, on 4 June, the Council of State issued a second review, rejecting the compromise to allow simple adoption for all couples while restricting plenary adoption to opposite-sex couples only. On 19 June 2013, the Legal Affairs Committee decided to back full adoption rights for same-sex couples. The bill was expected to be voted on by Parliament in the autumn of 2013, however, a further delay was caused by elections in October 2013 following the resignation of the Juncker–Asselborn Government.

The coalition agreement of the new Bettel–Schneider Government, sworn in on 4 December 2013 and led by gay Prime Minister Xavier Bettel, included marriage and adoption rights for same-sex couples, scheduled for the first trimester of 2014. On 8 January 2014, the Minister of Justice, Félix Braz, stated that Parliament would vote on the bill in the summer of 2014 and, if approved, it would take effect before the end of 2014.

On 19 March 2014, the Legal Affairs Committee completed its work on the marriage bill, and sent it to the Council of State, which released its opinion on 20 May 2014. On 28 May, the committee voted to send the bill to the Chamber of Deputies, with every political party except the Alternative Democratic Reform Party (ADR) being in favour. The legislation was approved by the Chamber of Deputies in a 56–4 vote on 18 June 2014. On 24 June, the Council of State gave its consent to skip the second vote. The law was promulgated by Grand Duke Henri on 4 July and published in the official gazette on 17 July 2014. It took effect the first day of the sixth month after publication (i.e. 1 January 2015). In addition to providing full adoption rights to same-sex couples, the law allows lesbian couples to access artificial insemination in a relatively similar manner to opposite-sex couples. A notable distinction is that lesbian couples require approval from a psychologist. Although opposite-sex couples are also generally directed to a psychologist, the consultation is not mandatory.

The first same-sex couple to marry in Luxembourg was Messrs Henri Lorenzo Huber and Jean-Paul Olinger in Differdange on 1 January 2015. The marriage ceremony was performed by Mayor Roberto Traversini. On 15 May 2015, Prime Minister Xavier Bettel married his partner Gauthier Destenay in a private ceremony at Luxembourg City Hall. Bettel became the first EU member state leader and just the second serving head of government worldwide (after Iceland's Jóhanna Sigurðardóttir) to marry a person of the same sex. In November 2016, Vice Prime Minister Etienne Schneider confirmed that he and his partner Jérôme Domange had married in a private ceremony sometime in 2016.

In June 2014, the Chamber of Deputies invalidated a petition that sought to repeal the new marriage law. On 16 November 2015, however, a court declared the petition valid. The petition, called Schutz fir d'Kand in Luxembourgish ("Protection of the Child"), accompanied with about 4,500 signatures, was then re-presented to the Chamber of Deputies, which rejected it again in November 2016. On 7 July 2015, a proposal by an ADR deputy to organize a referendum on opening marriage and adoption to same-sex couples was rejected by every other political party in the Chamber of Deputies.

On 19 November 2015, a bill was introduced to Parliament to ensure recognition of same-sex marriages performed abroad before 1 January 2015. It was approved by the Chamber of Deputies on 19 April 2016 in a 50–3 vote, and on 3 May, the Council of State gave its consent to skip the second vote in the Chamber. The law was promulgated on 23 May, published in the official journal on 1 June, and took effect on 5 June 2016.

Statistics
In 2015, approximately 120 same-sex marriages took place in Luxembourg; 49 and 11 of which occurred in Luxembourg City and Esch-sur-Alzette, the two largest cities in the country. This represented about 7% of all marriages. About 69% of same-sex partners who married that year were aged above 40 (74% for male couples and 61% for female couples).

Religious performance
In May 2015, the Protestant Church of Luxembourg voted to allow its pastors to bless same-sex marriages in its churches.

Public opinion
A 2006 Angus Reid Global Monitor poll found that 58% of Luxembourgers supported same-sex marriage.

An April 2013 PoliMonitor survey commissioned by the Luxemburger Wort and RTL Télé Lëtzebuerg placed support for same-sex marriage in Luxembourg at 83% and for adoption by same-sex couples at 55%.

The 2015 Eurobarometer found that 75% of Luxembourgers thought same-sex marriage should be allowed throughout Europe, while 20% were opposed. In 2019, the Eurobarometer showed that support had increased to 85%, with 9% opposed.

See also
LGBT rights in Luxembourg
Recognition of same-sex unions in Europe

Notes

References

LGBT rights in Luxembourg
Luxembourg
2015 in LGBT history